"Next Year" is a song by Northern Irish indie rock band Two Door Cinema Club from their second studio album, Beacon (2012). The song was released on 15 February 2013 as the album's third single.

Charts

2012 songs
Two Door Cinema Club songs
Song recordings produced by Jacknife Lee